Octa is an unincorporated community in Dunklin County, in the U.S. state of Missouri.

History
A post office called Octa was established in 1903, and remained in operation until 1908. The origin of the name Octa is obscure.

References

Unincorporated communities in Dunklin County, Missouri
Unincorporated communities in Missouri